Lindsey Nelson Stadium is a baseball stadium in Knoxville, Tennessee.  It is the home field of the University of Tennessee Volunteers college baseball team.  The stadium opened on February 23, 1993 and holds 4,387 people.  The facility is named after Hall of Fame broadcaster Lindsey Nelson, who attended the university and founded the Vol Radio Network.

From 2006 to 2019, the university undertook three major renovations to the stadium. Originally a natural grass playing surface, the 2019 renovation converted the field to Field Turf. Other renovations included premium seating, outfield wall improvements, and player facilities.

In 2013, the Volunteers ranked 38th in among Division I baseball programs in attendance, averaging 1,846 per home game.

See also
 List of NCAA Division I baseball venues

Notes

References

College baseball venues in the United States
Baseball venues in Tennessee
Buildings and structures in Columbia, Tennessee
Sports venues in Knoxville, Tennessee
Tennessee Volunteers baseball
1993 establishments in Tennessee
Sports venues completed in 1993